Khadem is a given name and surname; it may refer to:

Given name
 Khadem al-Qubaisi (born 1971), Emirati managing director of the IPIC

Surname
 Abdelaziz Belkhadem (born 1945), Algerian politician
 Ali Khademhosseini (born 1975), Iranian-Canadian bioengineer
 Amir Reza Khadem (born 1970), Iranian wrestler 
 Dhikru'llah Khadem (1904–1986), Iranian Hand of the Cause
 Mohammad Khadem (born 1935), Iranian wrestler
 Rasoul Khadem (born 1972), Iranian wrestler
 Samir El-Khadem (born 1942), Lebanese former Commander of the Lebanese Naval Forces

Places
 Khademabad, village in Razaviyeh District, Mashhad County, Iran
 Khadem Anlu, village in Chapeshlu District, Dargaz County, Iran

See also
 Al-Akhdam

Arabic-language surnames
Arabic masculine given names
Iranian-language surnames